Hermann Stessl (born 3 September 1940, in Graz) is an Austrian retired football player and coach.

Career
Stessl played for Grazer AK, starting his first team career in 1957.

Stessl has coached FC Zürich Grazer AK, Austria Vienna, AEK Athens, FC Porto, SV Austria Salzburg and Boavista SC.

With FK Austria Wien, he won four Austrian football championships in 1978, 1979, 1986 and 1993. With Austria, he also reached the final of the European Cup Winners' Cup 1977–78, losing 4–0 to Belgium's R.S.C. Anderlecht.

He now runs a football academy, the Hermann Stessl  Fußballschule.

References

External links
 Hermann Stessl football academy official site 
 

1940 births
Living people
Footballers from Graz
Austrian footballers
Austrian football managers
Austrian expatriate sportspeople in Spain
Grazer AK players
Grazer AK managers
FK Austria Wien managers
FC Porto managers
FC Zürich managers
Kapfenberger SV managers
Racing de Santander managers
AEK Athens F.C. managers
SK Sturm Graz managers
Vitória S.C. managers
Boavista F.C. managers
Association football midfielders